Voyeur II is a first person full-motion video game released in July 1996 by Philips Media and Interweave Entertainment, starring Jennifer O'Neill. The game is a sequel to Voyeur, released in 1993.

Plot
This time hidden cameras were placed on an isolated mountain cabin where various people have gathered for the reading of a will that is expected to give Dr. Elizabeth Duran control of a lucrative research institute. All of the cabin guests want control of the institute, and the player's goals are to prevent the murder of Dr. Duran, expose Everett's killer, and obtain evidence justifying the player's actions to Sheriff Parker.

Cast
Jennifer O'Neill - Dr. Elizabeth Duran
David Groh - Sylvio Donato
Mathew Flint - Peter Cussler
Karen Mayo-Chandler - Rachel Cussler
Devin Spirtas - Colin
Kari Whitman - Candace
William Paul Burns - Dr. Everett Cussler
Dennis Weaver - Sheriff John Parker

Gameplay
Style of play is similar to Voyeur and Night Trap. The game cannot be saved, being played through continuously, and is intended to be replayed with new decisions to achieve different endings.

Reception 
Reception for this game was positive. Critics liked the fast action and that players are always kept on their toes.

References

External links
 
 

1996 video games
Classic Mac OS games
DOS games
Erotic video games
Full motion video based games
Video games developed in the United States
Windows games